The 2010 ACC Trophy Elite was a cricket tournament in  Kuwait, taking place between March 31 and April 9, 2010. It gives Associate and Affiliate members of the Asian Cricket Council experience of international one-day cricket and also helps forms an essential part of regional rankings. The tournament was won by Afghanistan, who defeated Nepal by 95 runs in the final on April 9.

Teams

After the 2006 ACC Trophy it was decided to split the tournament into two divisions. The placement of teams in the divisions was based on their final positions in the last ACC Trophy. The top ten teams went on to take part in the 2008 ACC Trophy Elite and the remaining teams were placed in a lower division, the 2009 ACC Trophy Challenge. Bottom two teams were relegated from 2008 ACC Trophy Elite and top two teams from 2009 ACC Trophy Challenge were promoted.  The teams that made it into the Trophy Elite were:

Squads

Group stages

Group A

Group B

Play-offs

9th place play-off

7th place play-off

5th place play-off

3rd place play-off

Semi-finals

Final

Final Placings

Statistics

Controversy
The tournament was beset with players struggling to get visas to gain access to Kuwait. Bahrain were forced to withdraw from the tournament as they were unable to field a team after a large number of their players were refused visas.

Mohammad Nabi, the Afghanistan all-rounder was refused as visa, as was Hong Kong captain Najeeb Amar. Both were later able to gain entry to Kuwait and take part in the later stages of the tournament.

The Cricket Association of Nepal President Binay Raj Pandey has said his board intends to raise the issue at the next meeting of the Asian Cricket Council after Nepal vice-captain Gyanendra Malla had been refused entry to the country. In response to this, Pandey intends to ask the ACC not to host future tournaments in countries where obtaining a visa is difficult.

References

2010
2010 in Kuwaiti sport
International cricket competitions in 2010
International cricket competitions in Kuwait